The Glenn H. Curtiss Museum is a transportation museum in Hammondsport, New York with a focus on the early aviator Glenn H. Curtiss. The 60,000 square foot facility has a collection of aircraft, vintage motorcycles, automobiles, and aircraft engines.

History 
The museum was founded in the summer of 1962 by Otto Kohl. It was originally located in a former high school. However, in 1992, the museum relocated to a former winery building south of Hammondsport.

Collection 
The museum contains over 20 aircraft, including AEA June Bug (reproduction), Curtiss Model D (reproduction), Curtiss Model E, "America" flying boat, JN-4D Jenny, Curtiss Model MF "Seagull", Curtiss Oriole, Curtiss Robin, C-46 Commando, three Mercury Aircraft, a 2/3 scale Curtiss P-40 Warhawk reproduction, and Curtiss-Wright Junior. The museum also displays 16 automobiles, the majority of which are on loan. Smaller collections include bicycles, wooden boats, and motorcycles.

References

External links
Official website

Museums in Steuben County, New York
Curtiss
Transportation museums in New York (state)